Joe Rosenthal  (1921 – July 1, 2018) was a Canadian sculptor. He travelled and sketched in the Northwest Territories, Mexico, Cuba, England, the Netherlands, France, Italy, Spain, Greece, Jordan, Israel, and Egypt. He was a member of the Royal Canadian Academy of Arts and the Ontario Society of Artists.

Early years
Rosenthal was born in 1921 in Romania (now Moldova). He emigrated to Canada in 1927. From 1942 to 1945, he served in the Canadian Army. He studied at the Ontario College of Art.

Legacy
He was awarded recognition by the Art Gallery of Ontario, the Canada Council, and the Toronto Outdoor Exhibition. He won first prize in the National Open Sculpture Competition for the Dr. Sun Yat Sen Monument. He was awarded The Rabin International Presentation Sculpture, Los Angeles, 1996. He latterly lived in Toronto, Ontario, Canada and died in July 2018 at the age of 97.

Family
Rosenthal was the brother-in-law of Ross Dowson and was a member of the Revolutionary Workers' Party until the early 1950s when he was part of a split concerning the group's orientation towards the Co-operative Commonwealth Federation. His wife, Joyce Rosenthal, Ross Dowson's sister, was a long-time socialist and an activist in the women's movement, particularly around abortion rights. She co-founded the Ontario chapter of the Canadian Hemophilia Society after discovering that their son, Ron, was a hemophiliac.

Works

References

External links
Works on public display in Toronto on Dittwald Art Photo Collection

1921 births
2018 deaths
Artists from Chișinău
Moldovan Jews
Romanian emigrants to Canada
Artists from Toronto
Canadian sculptors
Canadian male sculptors
Canadian Trotskyists
OCAD University alumni
Members of the Royal Canadian Academy of Arts